The Nara Visa School is a historic school building in Nara Visa, New Mexico. The school was built in 1921 during the settlement of eastern New Mexico. Architect Joseph Champ Berry, noted for his work in the Texas Panhandle, designed the Mission Revival building. While the building's plain facade and red tile roof are typical of the Mission Revival style, the wood corbel brackets along the roof reflect local vernacular designs and American Craftsman influences. A gymnasium built by the Works Progress Administration and several contributing outbuildings are also on the property. The school closed in 1968 and the building is now a community center. The site was added to the National Register of Historic Places in 1983.

See also

National Register of Historic Places in Quay County, New Mexico

References

External links

Buildings and structures in Union County, New Mexico
School buildings on the National Register of Historic Places in New Mexico
Defunct schools in New Mexico
Mission Revival architecture in New Mexico
1921 establishments in New Mexico
National Register of Historic Places in Union County, New Mexico